"I Lost My Heart to a Starship Trooper", sometimes cited as "(I Lost My Heart to A) Starship Trooper", is a 1978 single written by Jeff Calvert and Geraint Hughes of Typically Tropical and performed by Sarah Brightman and Hot Gossip. It was the debut of the 18-year-old singer, and reached number six on the UK Singles Chart.

Background

The song is a space disco track that cashed in on the media hype surrounding the original Star Wars film. The lyrics include the lines "And evil Darth Vader he's been banished to Mars" and "Or are you like a droid, devoid of emotion". Other science fiction references include: "I lost my heart to a starship trooper", "Flash Gordon's left me, he's gone to the stars", "What my body needs is close encounter three", "Static on the comm – it's Starfleet Command" and "Fighting for the Federation"

The song uses musical themes from Star Wars, Thus Spoke Zarathustra (from 2001: A Space Odyssey), and the "spaceship communication" melody from Close Encounters of the Third Kind.

The song was performed on The Kenny Everett Video Show by its regular dance troupe Hot Gossip.  Its lead, Sarah Brightman, was dressed in a silver catsuit and black thigh-high boots.

In 1997, Brightman rerecorded the song, with producer Frank Peterson, and released it as a single to coincide with the film Starship Troopers. Although the single carried artwork from the film, the song itself was not in the film.

Weekly charts

Certifications

References

External links
A video of a live dance performance of the song
Song lyrics 

1978 songs
1978 debut singles
Sarah Brightman songs
Song recordings produced by Steve Rowland
British disco songs